The list of EuroLeague Women winning coaches shows all head coaches who won the EuroLeague Women, the top-tier professional basketball club competition in Europe, previously called FIBA Women's European Champions Cup (1958-1996).

By year

By titles

See also 

 List of EuroLeague Women winning players

External links
 
 List of winners with rosters

Winning coaches
EuroLeague